In military terms, 133rd Division or 133rd Infantry Division may refer to:

Infantry Divisions:
 133rd Division (2nd Formation)(People's Republic of China), 1979–1985
 133rd Division (Imperial Japanese Army)
 133rd Rifle Division (Soviet Union)

Armoured Divisions
 Italian 133rd Division